The American Airways Hangar and Administration Building is located on the grounds of Fort Worth Meacham International Airport in Fort Worth, Texas. The hangar and office opened in 1933 and cost $150,000 to construct. The two-story building measures 235 feet by 120 feet and is constructed of brick, steel and reinforced concrete. The hangar was designed by Russian-born architect Abraham Epstein.

It is the oldest building of Meacham Field. The southern, hangar portion is about two-thirds of the building;  the two-story brick administration building portion makes up about one-third, on the north. It has fluted cast stone pilasters, which include the American Airlines eagle in bas-relief capitals. The eagle appears above "American Airways" written in cast stone at the middle of the administration building.

It was added to the National Register of Historic Places on April 16, 2008.

See also

National Register of Historic Places listings in Tarrant County, Texas

References

External links

National Register of Historic Places in Fort Worth, Texas
Aircraft hangars on the National Register of Historic Places
Transportation buildings and structures in Fort Worth, Texas
Air transportation buildings and structures on the National Register of Historic Places
1933 establishments in Texas